The Sejny Priest Seminary or Sejny Theological Seminary (Lithuanian: Seinų kunigų seminarija) was a Catholic priest seminary established in Sejny (now Poland) in 1826. The courses lasted five years. Up until its dissolution in 1926, the seminary was an important center of Lithuanian culture, educating many prominent figures of the Lithuanian National Revival.

History 
The Sejny Seminary was established by bishop  to address shortages of Lithuanian-speaking priests. At first the seminary was small. Later, when seminaries in Tykocin (1863) and Kielce (1893) were closed and merged, the Sejny Seminary grew to 60–80 students. A large portion of the students were sons of Lithuanian peasants from Suvalkija.

20th century 
In 1915, during World War I, the seminary was evacuated into Russia (first Mogilev, then Saint Petersburg). In 1919 the seminary returned to Sejny, but the town was at the center of the Polish–Lithuanian War. After the Polish seizure of Sejny after an uprising done by the Polish Military Organisation in August 1919, the Lithuanian students and faculty were expelled into Lithuania, where the seminary continued in Zypliai and Gižai. In 1926 the Sejny Seminary was renamed to Vilkaviškis Priest Seminary and ceased to exist.

Alumni
 Mykolas Krupavičius, politician
 Vincas Kudirka, writer, founder of Varpas
 Vincas Mickevičius-Kapsukas, communist activist (expelled after a year)
 Vincas Mykolaitis-Putinas, writer
 Justinas Staugaitis, signatory of the Act of Independence of Lithuania
 Jonas Totoraitis, historian

References

Sources 

 

Educational institutions established in 1826
Educational institutions disestablished in 1926
Catholic seminaries
Defunct universities and colleges in Poland
History of Lithuania (1795–1918)
1826 establishments in the Russian Empire
1826 establishments in Poland